Adam Richard Fleming (born 15 May 1948) is a British billionaire, and the chairman of the asset management company Stonehage Fleming.

Early life
Adam Richard Fleming was born on 15 May 1948, the son of Major Richard Evelyn Fleming (1910–1977) and the Hon. Dorothy Charmian Hermon-Hodge, daughter of Roland Herman Hermon-Hodge, 2nd Baron Wyfold. He has seven brothers and sisters.

His grandfather was Major Valentine Fleming (1882–1917), and his great-grandfather was the Scottish banker Robert Fleming, founder of the merchant bank Robert Fleming & Co. His uncle on his father's side was the James Bond novelist Ian Fleming.

He was educated at Abberley Hall School and Eton.

Career
He started his career in 1970 as a stock market analyst at Robert Fleming & Co., the company founded by his great-grandfather, earning £7 per week.

In April 2015, The Sunday Times Rich List estimated his family's net worth at £1.5 billion.

Fleming is chairman of Wits Gold, chairman of the Johannesburg Land Company, a director of Zambeef Products, chairman of Fleming Family & Partners, and has farming interests in Zambia and South Africa.

Fleming describes himself as "just a long-term investor with firm beliefs in gold".

Personal life
He is married to Caroline Wake. They live on a farm in the Cotswolds and have four children, Hector, Nell, Angus and Dickon. His son Hector Fleming is a former director of Standard Chartered's private equity team, co-founded the investment company Fleming Wulfsohn Africa, and is a director of Imara, The Johannesburg Land Company, Clover Alloys, GoldMoney Networks and Netagio Holdings.

He is a member of White's, London, and the Rand Club of Johannesburg.

References

Living people
1948 births
British billionaires
British corporate directors
Adam
People educated at Eton College
Conservative Party (UK) donors